The 2021 F4 Argentina Championship was the inaugural season of the F4 Argentina Championship. It was a multi-event motor racing championship for open wheel, formula racing cars regulated according to FIA Formula 4 regulations. The championship uses Mygale M14-F4 chassis. The season commenced on 16 April at Autódromo Ciudad de Concordia and concluded on 4 December at Autódromo Oscar Cabalén.

Driver lineup

Race calendar 
All rounds were held in Argentina. Initially, the series planned to support the entire inaugural season of TCR South America but the idea was dropped later on due to travel restrictions and the limit of two abroad rounds. The first four rounds supported Turismo Pista. The planned second round at Autódromo de Concepción del Uruguay was postponed and the circuit was chosen to be the host of the third round. After the cancellation of the round at Autódromo Municipal Juan Manuel Fangio on 9–10 September, the next two events were expanded to three races. All rounds but the fifth one supported Turismo Pista. The championship raced alongside the TCR series for the last two rounds.

Championship standings 
Points were awarded as follows:

Drivers' standings

Notes

References

External links 

 

Argentina
F4 Argentina Championship seasons
Argentina
F4